The 2022 Challenger de Tigre II was a professional tennis tournament played on clay courts. It was the second edition of the tournament which was part of the 2022 ATP Challenger Tour. It took place in Tigre, Argentina between 25 April and 2 May 2022.

Singles main-draw entrants

Seeds

 1 Rankings are as of 18 April 2022.

Other entrants
The following players received wildcards into the singles main draw:
  Facundo Bagnis
  Román Andrés Burruchaga
  Alejo Lorenzo Lingua Lavallén

The following players received entry into the singles main draw as alternates:
  Gustavo Heide
  Cristian Rodríguez

The following players received entry from the qualifying draw:
  Daniel Cukierman
  Murkel Dellien
  Franco Emanuel Egea
  Santiago de la Fuente
  Juan Ignacio Galarza
  Conner Huertas del Pino

Champions

Singles

  Camilo Ugo Carabelli def.  Andrea Collarini 7–5, 6–2.

Doubles

  Guillermo Durán /  Felipe Meligeni Alves def.  Luciano Darderi /  Juan Bautista Torres 3–6, 6–4, [10–3].

References

2022 ATP Challenger Tour
2022 in Argentine tennis
April 2022 sports events in Argentina
May 2022 sports events in Argentina